HD 161840 is a single, blue-white hued star in the southern zodiac constellation of Scorpius. It is faintly visible to the naked eye with an apparent visual magnitude of 4.79. With an annual parallax shift of  it is located roughly 500 light years from the Sun. It is moving closer with a heliocentric radial velocity of −13 km/s.

There has been some uncertainty as to the classification of this stage. Houk (1979) lists a stellar class of B8 Ib/II for HD 161840, which corresponds to a B-type bright giant/lesser supergiant mix. Multiple studies still use an older classification of B8 V, suggesting instead this is a B-type main-sequence star. Garrison and Gray (1994) assigned it a class of B8 III-IV, which would put it on the subgiant/giant star track. It has an estimated 3.93 times the mass of the Sun and 3.2 times the Sun's radius. The star is radiating 565 times the Sun's luminosity from its photosphere at an effective temperature of 11,066 K.

References

B-type main-sequence stars
B-type bright giants
Scorpius (constellation)
Durchmusterung objects
161840
087220
6628